The BRM 4-cylinder engines are a series of four-stroke, naturally-aspirated, inline-four Formula One racing engines, designed, developed and built by British Racing Motors, between  and . They were exclusively used by BRM; and powered the BRM team cars. It was constructed to conform the FIA engine requirements; necessitating a 2.5 L naturally-aspirated engine displacement formula.

Applications
BRM P25
BRM P48

References

Formula One engines
1950s in motorsport
1960s in motorsport
Straight-four engines